Elyane Boal (born ) is a Cape Verdean individual rhythmic gymnast. She represents her nation at international competitions. She competed at world championships, including 2015 World Rhythmic Gymnastics Championships. She has been selected to compete at the 2016 Olympic Games held in Rio de Janeiro.

References

1998 births
Living people
Cape Verdean rhythmic gymnasts
Place of birth missing (living people)
Gymnasts at the 2016 Summer Olympics
Olympic gymnasts of Cape Verde